Batman is an American live-action television series based on the DC Comics character of the same name. It stars Adam West as Bruce Wayne/Batman and Burt Ward as Dick Grayson/Robin—two crime-fighting heroes who defend Gotham City from a variety of archvillains. It is known for its camp style, upbeat theme music, and its intentionally humorous, simplistic morality (aimed at its largely teenage audience). This included championing the importance of using seat belts, doing homework, eating vegetables, and drinking milk. It was described by executive producer William Dozier as the only situation comedy on the air without a laugh track. The 120 episodes aired on the ABC network for three seasons from January 12, 1966, to March 14, 1968, twice weekly during the first two seasons, and weekly for the third. In 2016, television critics Alan Sepinwall and Matt Zoller Seitz ranked Batman as the 82nd greatest American television series of all time. A companion feature film was released in 1966 between the first and second seasons of the TV show.

Batman held the record for the longest-running live-action superhero television series (in terms of episodes) until it was surpassed by Smallville in 2007.

Overview
The series focuses on Batman and Robin as they defend Gotham City from its various criminals. Although the lives of their alter-egos, millionaire Bruce Wayne and his ward Dick Grayson are frequently shown, it is usually only briefly, in the context of their being called away on superhero business or in circumstances where they need to employ their public identities to assist in their crime-fighting. The "Dynamic Duo" typically comes to the aid of the Gotham City Police Department upon the latter being stumped by a supervillain, who was accompanied in his/her appearances by several henchmen and an attractive female companion. Throughout each episode, Batman and Robin follow a series of seemingly improbable clues (also known as "bat logic") to discover the supervillain's plan, then figure out how to thwart that plan and capture the criminal.

For the first two seasons, Batman aired twice a week on consecutive nights. Every story is a two-parter, except for two three-parters featuring villainous team-ups (the Joker and the Penguin, then the Penguin and Marsha, Queen of Diamonds) in the second season. The titles of each multi-part story usually rhyme. The third and final season, which aired one episode a week and introduced Yvonne Craig as Barbara Gordon/Batgirl, consist of self-contained stories. Each third-season story ends with a teaser featuring the next episode's guest villain, except for the series finale. The cliffhangers between multiple-part stories consist of villains holding someone captive, usually Batman or Robin, with the captive(s) being threatened by death, serious injury, or another fate. These cliffhangers are resolved early in the follow-up episode with Batman and Robin getting themselves out of every trap.

Ostensibly a crime series, the style of the show is intentionally campy and tongue-in-cheek. It exaggerates situations and plays them for laughs, though the characters take the absurd situations very seriously.

Cast and characters

Regular cast
 Adam West as Bruce Wayne/Batman:  A multi-millionaire industrialist whose parents were murdered when he was a child and who now secretly uses his vast fortune to fight crime as the masked crime fighter Batman. Producer William Dozier cast Adam West in the role after seeing him perform as the James Bond-like spy Captain Q in a Nestlé Quik television commercial. Lyle Waggoner had screen-tested for the role, though West ultimately won out because, it was said, he was the only person who could deliver his lines with a straight face. West later voiced an animated version of the title character on The New Adventures of Batman.
 Burt Ward as Dick Grayson/Robin: Batman's sidekick, dubbed the "Boy Wonder": a high school student noted for his recurring interjections in the form of "Holy , Batman!" The series avoids referencing Robin's origins as Bruce Wayne's fellow "crime orphan," as whose legal guardian the courts appoint Bruce. Ward voiced an animated version of this character on The New Adventures of Batman. Since the death of Adam West on June 9, 2017, Burt Ward is now the only surviving main Batman cast member.
 Alan Napier as Alfred: Batman's loyal butler and Batgirl's discreet confidant. He is the only person who knows the true identities of Bruce Wayne, Dick Grayson, and Barbara Gordon.
 Neil Hamilton as Commissioner Gordon: The Commissioner of the Gotham City Police Department and one of Batman's two major police contacts. He summons the Dynamic Duo via the Batphone or the Bat Signal.
 Stafford Repp as Chief O'Hara: Gotham City's Chief of Police, and Batman's other major police contact. The character was created by Semple for the series, as someone for Gordon to talk to, and later briefly added to the comics. In 2013, DC revealed this incarnation's first name to be "Miles" in their Batman' 66 comics.
 Madge Blake as Harriet Cooper:  Dick Grayson's maternal aunt. She first appeared in the comics, two years before the series premiered, to give Bruce and Dick a reason to be secretive about their dual identities.
 Yvonne Craig as Barbara Gordon/Batgirl: Commissioner Gordon's daughter, Gotham City librarian, and crime-fighting partner for Batman and Robin in the third season. Occasionally, this threesome was nicknamed the "Terrific Trio."
 William Dozier as Narrator (uncredited).

According to Adam West's memoir Back to the Batcave, his first exposure to the series concept was through reading a sample script in which Batman enters a nightclub in his complete costume and requests a booth near the wall, as he "shouldn't wish to attract attention." It was the scrupulously formal dialogue, and the way that Batman earnestly believed he could avoid standing out while wearing a skintight blue-and-grey costume, that convinced West of the character's comic potential.

Recurring villains

 Cesar Romero as The Joker:A clown-themed, prank-loving villain and Batman's arch-enemy, who leaves behind jokes as clues to his next crime.
 Burgess Meredith as The Penguin: A penguin-themed gentleman thief who commits crimes using multipurpose umbrellas.
 Frank Gorshin (Seasons 1–3) and John Astin (Season 2) as The Riddler:A criminal who leaves behind riddles as clues to his crimes.
 Julie Newmar (Seasons 1–2) and Eartha Kitt (Season 3) as The Catwoman:A cat-themed jewel thief and cat burglar in a complicated love-hate relationship with Batman.
 Victor Buono as Professor William McElroy/King Tut:An Egyptologist who developed a split personality after being struck on the head during a student protest. Each time he is hit on the head, he switches between the personalities of a university professor and a reincarnated version of the pharaoh Tutankhamun.
 George Sanders (Season 1), Otto Preminger and Eli Wallach (Season 2) as Dr. Art Schivel/Mr. Freeze:A mad scientist who, after exposure to a freeze solution, now needs below-freezing temperatures to survive. His weapon of choice is a freeze-blast gun, capable of freezing its target solid. In his first appearance, the gun can also produce a heat/incendiary beam.
 David Wayne as Jervis Tetch/Mad Hatter: A formally dressed villain with an obsession for collecting hats (he steals the hats from his victims, then knocks them out with a mesmerizing ray that pops out of the top of his hat).
 Vincent Price as Egghead:A smug, bald-headed genius whose crimes and speech patterns involve eggs.
 Carolyn Jones as Marsha, Queen of Diamonds:A criminal with a fondness for jewelry.
 Cliff Robertson as Shame: A Western-themed villain whose partners at various times include Okie Annie and Calamity Jan. The three of them spoof famous Western characters from the movies (namely Shane, Annie Oakley, and Calamity Jane).
 Anne Baxter as Olga, Queen of the Cossacks:A Russian villainess often paired with Egghead. Before this role, Baxter first appears in one story as "Zelda the Great," a magician criminal.
 Milton Berle as Louie the Lilac:A gangster with a fondness for flowers.

Producers did develop several tentative scripts for Two-Face, but never produced any of them. Clint Eastwood was allegedly considered for the role shortly before the series was cancelled.

Episodes

Production

Origin
In the early 1960s, Ed Graham Productions optioned the television rights to the comic book Batman and planned a straightforward juvenile adventure show, much like Adventures of Superman and The Lone Ranger, to air on CBS on Saturday mornings.

East Coast ABC executive Yale Udoff, a Batman fan in his childhood, contacted ABC executives Harve Bennett and Edgar J. Scherick, who were already considering developing a television series based on a comic-strip action hero, to suggest a prime-time Batman series in the hip and fun style of The Man from U.N.C.L.E. When negotiations between CBS and Graham stalled, DC Comics quickly reobtained rights and made the deal with ABC, which farmed the rights out to 20th Century Fox to produce the series.

In turn, 20th Century Fox handed the project to William Dozier and his production company, Greenway Productions. ABC and Fox were expecting a hip and fun—yet still serious—adventure show. However, Dozier, who had never before read comic books, concluded, after reading several Batman comics for research, that the only way to make the show work was to do it as a pop-art campy comedy. Originally, espionage novelist Eric Ambler was to have scripted a TV movie that would launch the television series, but he dropped out after learning of Dozier's campy comedy approach. Eventually, two sets of screen tests were filmed, one with Adam West and Burt Ward and the other with Lyle Waggoner and Peter Deyell, with West and Ward winning the roles.

Season 1

Lorenzo Semple Jr. had signed on as head scriptwriter. He wrote the pilot script, and generally wrote in a pop-art adventure style. Stanley Ralph Ross, Stanford Sherman, and Charles Hoffman were script writers who generally leaned more toward campy comedy, and in Ross's case, sometimes outright slapstick and satire. It was originally intended as a one-hour show, but ABC changed the premiere date from Fall 1966 to January of that year. With the network having only two early-evening half-hour time slots available, the show was split into two parts, to air twice a week in 30-minute installments on Wednesdays and Thursdays. A cliffhanger connected the two episodes, echoing the old movie serials.

Some ABC affiliates were not happy that ABC included a fourth commercial minute in every episode of Batman. One affiliate refused to air the series. The network insisted it needed the extra advertising revenue.

The Joker, the Penguin, the Riddler, Catwoman, Mr. Freeze, and the Mad Hatter, villains who originated in the comic books, all appeared in the series, the plots for which were deliberately villain-driven. According to the producers, Frank Gorshin was selected to portray Riddler due to the fact that he was a Batman fan since childhood. Catwoman was portrayed by three different actresses during the series run: by Julie Newmar in the first two seasons, by Lee Meriwether in the feature film based on the series, and by Eartha Kitt in the third and final season.

The show was extraordinarily popular, and was considered "the biggest TV phenomenon of the mid-1960s".

Season 2
Semple's participation in the series decreased in the second season. In his autobiography Back to the Batcave Adam West explained to Jeff Rovin – to whom he dictated the autobiography after rejecting an offer to contribute to The Official "Batman" Batbook written by Joel Eisner – that when work on the second season commenced following the completion of the feature film, Dozier, his immediate deputy Howie Horwitz, and the rest of the cast and crew rushed their preparation. Thus, they failed to give themselves enough time to determine what they wanted to do with the series during season two.

John Astin replaced Frank Gorshin as The Riddler for a pair of episodes when Gorshin's new agents at William Morris demanded more money.

Season 3

By season three, ratings were falling and the future of the series seemed uncertain. To attract new viewers, Dozier opted to introduce a female character. He came up with the idea of using Batgirl, who in her civilian identity would be Commissioner Gordon's daughter, Barbara, and asked the editor of the Batman comics to further develop the character (who had made her debut in a 1966 issue of Detective Comics). To convince ABC executives to introduce Batgirl as a regular on the show, a promotional short featuring Yvonne Craig as Batgirl and Tim Herbert as Killer Moth was produced. Batgirl was the first Superheroine to appear in an ongoing capacity on television. The show was reduced to once a week, with mostly self-contained episodes, although the following week's villain would be introduced in a tag at the end of each episode, similar to a soap opera. Accordingly, the narrator's cliffhanger phrases were mostly eliminated, most episodes ending with him encouraging viewers to watch next week.

Aunt Harriet was reduced to just two cameo appearances during the third season, due to Madge Blake's poor health and the issue of trying to fit so many characters (Batman, Robin, Batgirl, Alfred, Commissioner Gordon, Chief O'Hara, and a guest villain) into a half-hour episode. Another cast change during the final season was replacing Julie Newmar, who had been a popular recurring guest villain as the Catwoman during the first two seasons. Singer-actress Eartha Kitt assumed the role for season three, as Newmar was working on the film Mackenna's Gold at that time and thus unable to appear. In the United States, Kitt's performance in the series marked the second mainstream television success of a black female, following Nichelle Nichols as Lt. Uhura in Star Trek and continued breaking the racial boundaries of the time. Kitt's performance as Catwoman would also, later, inspire Halle Berry's portrayal of the character in the 2004 film Catwoman, in which Berry would mimic Kitt's purrs. Frank Gorshin, the original actor to play the Riddler, returned after a one-season hiatus, during which John Astin made one appearance in the role.

The nature of the scripts and acting started to enter into the realm of surrealism. In addition, the third season was much more topical, with references to hippies, mods, and distinctive 1960s slang, which the previous two seasons had avoided.

Episode format
As head scriptwriter, Lorenzo Semple wrote four episodes himself and established a series of "Bat-rules" for the freelance writers working under him. The show's campiness was played up in elements, including the design of the villains, dialogue and in signs appearing on various props. Batman would frequently reveal one of his many crime-fighting gadgets, which were usually given a ridiculous-sounding name, such as Shark Repellant Bat-Spray or Extra-Strong Bat-Knockout Gas. The series used a narrator (executive producer William Dozier, uncredited) who would end the cliffhanger episodes by intoning, "Tune in tomorrow – same Bat-time, same Bat-channel!" During the climactic fistfights in each episode, the punches and other impacts were punctuated by onomatopoeia (sound effects such as "POW!", "BAM!", "ZONK!") superimposed on the screen, as in comic-book fight scenes.

A typical story begins with a villain's caper (stealing a fabulous treasure, kidnapping a prominent person, attempting to take over Gotham City, etc). At police headquarters, Commissioner Gordon and Chief O'Hara deduce the villain's identity, admit they're outclassed and gaze reverently at the Batphone. At "stately Wayne Manor", Alfred (Wayne's butler) answers the Batphone and calls Bruce Wayne and Dick Grayson away from an oblivious Aunt Harriet with a humorously transparent excuse. Batman and Robin race the Batmobile to police headquarters and begin to work on the case. Batman and Robin locate the villain, lose in a brawl and are left alone in a ridiculously complex deathtrap. The episode ends in a cliffhanger. The next episode resolves the cliffhanger in a comically improbable fashion. The same general plot pattern of investigation and confrontation repeats until another major brawl that defeats the villain.

Cancellation
Near the end of the third season, ratings had dropped significantly, and ABC cancelled the show. NBC agreed to take over the series, but before it could do so, it was discovered that hundreds of thousands of dollars' worth of Batman sets had been destroyed. Rather than rebuild the sets, NBC dropped the project. Reruns of the series have been seen on a regular basis in the United States. They are currently shown on the classic TV networks TeleXitos, weekdays dubbed in Spanish, as well as Saturday mornings on IFC. As of 2022, the series can be found on the streaming app Tubi. It also appears Saturday nights on most MeTV stations in the U.S.A.

Camera shots
From the beginning, cameras were purposely placed out of level with the set (known as "Dutch tilt"), and characters were filmed from high and low angles. This technique was most often used when filming on the set of a villain's lair to lend a surreal, comic-book quality to the scenes, as well as to imply or merely remind the viewer that the crooks were crooked.

Batmobile

The original Batmobile from the 1960s TV series was auctioned on January 19, 2013 at the Barrett-Jackson auction house in Scottsdale, Arizona. It was sold for $4.2 million.

Tie-in music
Several cast members recorded music tied into the series. Adam West released a single titled "Miranda", a country-tinged pop song that he actually performed in costume during live appearances in the 1960s. Frank Gorshin released a song titled "The Riddler", which was composed and arranged by Mel Tormé. Burgess Meredith recorded a spoken-word single called "The Escape" backed with "The Capture", which consisted of the Penguin narrating his recent crime spree to a jazz beat. Burt Ward recorded a song called "Boy Wonder, I Love You", written and arranged by Frank Zappa.

In 1966, Batman: The Exclusive Original Soundtrack Album was released on LP, featuring music by Nelson Riddle and snippets of dialogue from Adam West, Burt Ward, Burgess Meredith, Frank Gorshin, Anne Baxter (as Zelda the Great) and George Sanders (the first Mr. Freeze). The "Batman Theme" was included, along with titles like "Batusi A Go! Go!", "Batman Thaws Mr. Freeze", and "Batman Blues". It was reissued later on compact disc. Neal Hefti, who wrote the iconic theme song for the series, also released a soundtrack album in 1966, Batman Theme and 11 Hefti Bat Songs.

Release

International broadcast

Home media

In January 2014, television host Conan O'Brien posted on his Twitter account, and Warner Bros. later confirmed, that Warner Bros. would release an official DVD and Blu-ray boxed set of the complete series sometime the same year. In April, the website tvshowsondvd.com quoted Burt Ward in saying that Warner Bros. would release the complete series on November 11, 2014, in time for the holiday season under license from 20th Century Fox Home Entertainment and that Adam West and he were doing special features for the release.

Prior to the announcement, multiple conflicting reports were given for the reason the series had not been released officially. These included:
 Negotiations between DC Comics (and parent company Warner Bros.), owners of the Batman character and 20th Century Fox Television (which in 2019 became a unit of Disney Television Studios, a part of The Walt Disney Company which own DC Entertainment rivals, Marvel Entertainment).
 Greenway/ABC/Fox rights issues: The Batman series was conceived as an equal partnership between William Dozier's Greenway Productions and Fox in 1964, before Fox entered into a separate agreement with ABC to produce the series in 1965. With three companies involved almost from the outset, some speculation indicated these rights were tangled even before the DC Comics character ownership rights were to be considered. In 2006, Deborah Dozier Potter, "the successor-in-interest to Greenway Productions" sued Fox for allegedly withholding monies under the Fox/ABC agreement. Dozier Potter further claimed that this came to her attention when, in March 2005, "she considered releasing the series on DVD", implying that (from her perspective at least) Greenway/Dozier Potter had some say in the matter of potential DVD release of the series. The case was resolved/dismissed in November 2007. In February 2005, John Stacks had approached Deborah Dozier Potter to market the series on DVD. There were many offers and lots of interest in the release of the series, as can be read in Joel Eisner's The Official Batbook Revised Bat Edition 2008. Soon after, Classic Media bought out the Dozier estate's interest in the series, which they then sold to Fox in the early years of the 2010s.
 Other complications/rights issues:
 Christopher D. Heer, writing at the "1966 Batman Message Board", clarified a quote by moderator Lee Kirkham, noting that there may have been the need for complicated deals regarding the numerous cameos, since "...at least some of the cameos were done as uncredited, unpaid walk-ons – which means that Fox does NOT have home video clearances for them. Either those scenes would have to be cut or an agreement reached with the actors".
 Kirkham's initial quote also noted that, alongside music clearance issues, there could also have been problems over some of the costumes, and the original Batmobile:
"It may surprise you, but then there are also rights issues concerning the design of the unique Batmobile design used in the show, and possibly a separate issue regarding some of the costumes as well!"

The series, under the Fox/ABC deal, is still in syndication, and regularly shown on a number of channels around the world, currently appearing in the United States on Me-TV and IFC . Until 2014, only the 1966 feature film was available on DVD from 20th Century Fox Home Entertainment for nonbroadcast viewing in North America. This affected the 2003 television movie reunion Return to the Batcave: The Misadventures of Adam and Burt, also released to DVD, which was able to make use of footage only from the 1966 movie.

With Batman being unavailable for home-video release until 2014, an unusual situation occurred in which material that would be considered DVD featurettes was released separately. In 2004, Image Entertainment released Holy Batmania, a two-DVD set that included documentaries on the making of the series, as well as rare footage such as the original screen tests of the cast and Lyle Waggoner. In 2008, Adam West released a privately issued DVD with the tongue-in-cheek title Adam West Naked for which he recorded anecdotes regarding all 120 episodes of the series. In 2013, PBS aired an episode of Pioneers of Television called "Superheroes" that featured interviews with Adam West and Burt Ward, and talked about the 1960s TV series. It was released on DVD March 11 the same year.

Also in 2013, PBS produced and transmitted a documentary titled Superheroes: A Never-Ending Battle. This documentary talked a little bit about the series and included an interview with Adam West.

Warner Bros. released the full 120-episode Batman collection on Blu-ray and DVD on November 11, 2014 (under license from 20th Century Fox) with a variety of extras including a miniature Batmobile, a 32-page episode guide, and The Adam West Scrapbook. A second box set released on Warner Bros.' own "batmanondvd" website replaces the Batmobile, The Adam West Scrapbook, and the trading cards with a letter from Adam West, a script from the episode "The Joker is Wild" and a bonus box containing the movie and the "Adam West Naked" documentary. This series is also available at the Google Play Store, and iTunes Store.

Reception
On review aggregator site Rotten Tomatoes, the series as a whole has received an approval rating of 72%. Additionally, the first season received an approval rating of 50%, based on twenty-two reviews, its consensus reads, "Holy mixed reception, Batman! - this deadpan farce translates the beloved comic strip with the punch of an onomatopoeia panel, but its overload of camp can be as grating as it is amusing." While the third season received an approval rating of 94%, based on sixteen reviews, its consensus reads, "Fierce females shook up the dynamic duo in the final season of Batman with plenty of technicolor "POW!""

Television critics Alan Sepinwall and Matt Zoller Seitz ranked Batman as the 82nd greatest American television show of all time in their 2016 book titled TV (The Book), stating that "West's performance, the brilliance of which has required decades to be properly recognized, played as if series creator William Dozier and chief developer Lorenzo Semple Jr., had taken the establishment's fantasy of itself and dolled it up in tights and a cape. The anarchic gangs of supervillains and henchmen that kept trying to capture or destroy Gotham City stood in for the forces of chaos that kept threatening to engulf so-called civilized America throughout the sixties, only made colorfully grotesque and knowingly silly". In 1997, TV Guide ranked the episodes "The Purr-fect Crime" and "Better Luck Next Time" #86 on its list of the 100 Greatest Episodes. In 2009, "Better Luck Next Time" was ranked No. 72.

Reunions and role reprisals

 In 1977, Adam West and Burt Ward returned as voice actors for the second Filmation-produced animated series, The New Adventures of Batman.
 In 1979, West, Ward, and Frank Gorshin reunited and reprised their respective roles on NBC for Hanna-Barbera's two Legends of the Superheroes television specials.
 In the 1980s, several cast members teamed up for a series of celebrity editions of Family Feud. The participants were West, Ward, Yvonne Craig, Lee Meriwether, and Vincent Price.
 In 1984, West would once again reprise his role as Batman in animated form when he succeeded Olan Soule in the final two seasons of Super Friends.
 November 1985 would see several cast members reunited on the syndicated afternoon talk show America, as West, Ward, Julie Newmar, Vincent Price, Cesar Romero, Terry Moore, Liberace, Eartha Kitt and Zsa Zsa Gabor (Yvonne Craig does not appear) were reunited along with the original Batmobile which was still covered with flocking from its tours since the 1970s. In the opening scene, West and Ward were in the Batmobile from an actual TV episode. They are segued from the TV film episode to the live stage again inside the Batmobile. They are introduced by Ricardo Montalban. Ward makes a request he would like to have a 15th anniversary reunion of the Batman Class of 1968.
 In 1997, West returned to the role of the Batman for the first time in 12 years voicing the Caped Crusader/Spruce Wayne in the animated short Boo Wonder. It was the fourth segment of episode 93 (season 5) of Animaniacs produced by Warner Bros. It was a parody of the 1966 Batman TV series with Animaniacs character Chicken Boo replacing Robin the Boy Wonder.
 In 2002, West and Ward did their voice-over, and reprised their roles as Batman and Robin in an episode of The Simpsons, "Large Marge". Bart Simpson with his friend, Milhouse Van Houten watched an old Batman episode as the dynamic duo were trapped on a carousel by Krusty the Clown as ClownFace. Batman and Robin made their escapes, thanks to their Bat Carousel Reversal Spray. The police arrested ClownFace and his henchmen.
 In 2003, West and Ward reunited for a tongue-in-cheek television movie titled Return to the Batcave: The Misadventures of Adam and Burt which combined dramatized recreations of the filming of the original series (with younger actors standing in for the stars), with modern footage of West and Ward searching for a stolen Batmobile. The film included cameo appearances by Newmar, Gorshin, and Lee Meriwether, as well as Lyle Waggoner, who had been an early candidate for the role of Batman. Yvonne Craig did not appear in the movie—she reportedly disliked the script. The movie was released on DVD in May 2005.
 In 2005, West again returned to the role of Batman/Bruce Wayne for the Digital Animation & Visual Effects (DAVE) School released Batman: New Times, a short CGI film in which all characters were portrayed as Minimates (predating the Lego film craze). In addition to West, other notable voice actors included Mark Hamill as The Joker, Courtney Thorne-Smith as Catwoman and Dick Van Dyke as Commissioner Gordon.
 Ward reprised his role as Dick Grayson / Robin in the 2019 Arrowverse crossover "Crisis on Infinite Earths".

Spin-offs and sequels

Batman (1966 film)

A film based on the television show, Batman, was released in 1966. The film was originally intended to be produced before the series as a way to introduce the series to the public. However, the series' premiere was moved up and the film was forced to wait until the summer hiatus after the first season. The film was produced quickly to get into theatres prior to the start of season two of the television series.

The film did not initially perform well in theaters. Originally, the movie had been conceived to help sell the television series abroad, but the success of the series in the United States was sufficient publicity. The film was shot after season one was filmed. The movie's budget allowed for producers to build the Batboat and lease a helicopter that would be made into the Batcopter, both of which were used in the second and third seasons of the television show.

Batman: Return of the Caped Crusaders

West and Ward announced at the Mad Monster Party that one or two Batman animated movies would be released in 2016 with the two doing voiced roles as their characters for the show's 50th anniversary along with Julie Newmar returning.

Batman: Return of the Caped Crusaders was released on Digital HD and Digital Media on October 11, 2016, and on DVD and Blu-ray November 1.

Batman vs. Two-Face

A sequel to Batman: Return of the Caped Crusaders called Batman vs. Two-Face was released on October 10, 2017. The film starred William Shatner voicing Two-Face as the main antagonist. Adam West died before it was released, but did complete his voiceover work before his passing. This was one of Adam West's final performances before he died from leukemia.

Batman '66

In 2013, DC began publication of Batman '66, a comic book series telling all-new stories set in the world of the 1966–68 TV series. Jeff Parker writes the series, which features cover art by Mike Allred and interior art by different artists each issue. In the course of this series, the Bookworm, the Minstrel, Sandman, Olga Queen of the Cossacks, Zelda The Great, Shame, and Marsha Queen of Diamonds all have their first appearance in Batman comics. Penguin, Joker, Riddler, Catwoman and Mr. Freeze also appear in the series. Issue #3 of Batman '66 introduced the Red Hood and Dr. Holly Quinn into the series continuity. In issue #7, Batman used a new vehicle, the Bat-Jet, to follow False-Face to Mount Rushmore. The series was to have introduced Killer Croc into the continuity, as well as a new villainess named Cleopatra. Issues #23 through #28 were mainly dedicated to introducing villains from the comics that either were not used, such as Solomon Grundy, Poison Ivy and Scarecrow, or did not exist at the time, such as Ra's al Ghul, Bane, the Harlequin (Dr. Quinn's criminal persona) and Killer Croc (who was introduced earlier as one of King Tut's henchmen, but gained a focus story). The first five issues were compiled into the Batman '66 Vol. 1 trade paperback in April 2014. Kevin Smith and Ralph Garman likewise worked on a Batman and Green Hornet crossover, titled Batman '66 meets The Green Hornet. The six-issue miniseries began publication in June 2014. Jeff Parker wrote a Batman and The Man from U.N.C.L.E. team-up titled Batman '66 meets The Man from U.N.C.L.E. released in 2016. Ian Edginton wrote a Batman team-up with John Steed and Emma Peel of The Avengers titled Batman '66 Meets Steed and Mrs. Peel. Batman teams up with Wonder Woman in the crossover team up Batman' 66 Meets Wonder Woman '77 writing by both Parker and Marc Andreyko. In a reversal of sorts, Archie Comics produced the next crossover titled, Archie Meets Batman '66, released as a six issue mini series in July 2018. The series was written by Batman '66 veteran Jeff Parker and Archies stalwart Michael Moreci. Mike Allred returned to create the main covers with Archie artists creating the alternative covers and interior art.

Other comics
A version of Batman closely resembling his 1960s TV Series counterpart briefly appears in the 2003 Planetary/Batman one-shot by DC Comics.

The 7th issue of Solo featured a short adventure titled Batman A-Go-Go!, which was created by writer/artist Mike Allred as a tribute to the 1960s TV series.

Bluewater Comics has released a series of comics that take their cue from the TV show. They are The Mis-Adventures of Adam West, The Secret Lives of Julie Newmar, and Burt Ward, Boy Wonder and are similar in tone to the TV series. The Mis-Adventures of Adam West is a four-issue miniseries and a regular series that ran nine issues. The Secret Lives of Julie Newmar is a four-issue miniseries and Burt Ward, Boy Wonder was going to be a four-issue miniseries, but has not yet been published in full (although a promotional first issue was released for Free Comic Book Day).

Crossovers

The Green Hornet

Van Williams and Bruce Lee made a cameo appearance as the Green Hornet and Kato in "window cameos" while the Batman and Robin were climbing a building. This was in part one of a two-part second-season episode of the Batman TV series, "The Spell of Tut", which aired on September 28, 1966.

Later that same season, the Green Hornet and Kato appeared in the two-part second-season episodes A Piece of the Action and Batman's Satisfaction, which aired on March 1–2, 1967. In the two episodes, the Green Hornet and Kato are in Gotham City to bust a counterfeit stamp ring run by Colonel Gumm (portrayed by Roger C. Carmel). The Batman's Satisfaction episode leads to a mixed fight, with both Batman & Robin and the Green Hornet & Kato fighting Colonel Gumm and his gang. Once Gumm's crew was defeated, Batman and Robin squared off against the Green Hornet and Kato, resulting in a stand-off that was interrupted by the police. In this episode, Batman, Robin and the police consider the Green Hornet and Kato to be criminals, although Batman and Robin were cordial to the duo in the earlier window appearance. There is also a mention of The Green Hornet TV series on the Batman TV series episode The Impractical Joker (episode 55, Part 1, aired November 16, 1966): while watching TV together, Alfred, Dick Grayson and Bruce Wayne (who says, "It's time to watch The Green Hornet", with the hornet buzzing sound audible in the background) are interrupted by the Joker; then, after the interruption, The Green Hornet TV series theme music is heard.

In the December 9, 1966 Green Hornet episode "The Secret of the Sally Bell", the Batmobile can be seen revolving on its turntable floor in the Batcave on a bad guy's TV set. In the February 3, 1967 Green Hornet episode "Ace in the Hole" (which aired between the September 1966 and March 1967 Batman appearances mentioned above), Batman and Robin can be seen climbing a building on a television set. There was one other Green Hornet & Kato appearance that was not on the Batman TV series nor on The Green Hornet TV series: a segment of the Milton Berle Show/The Hollywood Palace aired in the Fall of 1966 brought together The Green Hornet and Kato (Van Williams and Bruce Lee), and Batman (Adam West), in a comedy sketch with Milton Berle, in which Bruce Lee demonstrates his martial arts expertise. Burt Ward as "Robin" was not included in this appearance.

Arrowverse

The Arrowverse crossover event "Crisis on Infinite Earths" features a cameo appearance from Burt Ward as an older Dick Grayson/Robin, wearing a red sweater with a yellow and green trim while walking a dog. Upon seeing the skies turn red, the former Boy Wonder shouts "Holy crimson skies of death!" The event also reveals that the events of this series are set on Earth-66, which is one of the worlds destroyed by the Anti-Monitor (LaMonica Garrett) during the Crisis.

In other media

Commercials
 Lava Soap Grime Fighters – in this 1966 commercial Batman and Robin had just wrapped up the latest crime when Commissioner Gordon notices Chief O'Hara's dirty hands and asks Batman to pass the chief a bar of Lava Soap.
 Rally Car Wax – Batman and Robin demonstrate this DuPont product on the Batmobile before pursuing the Joker in a 1974 commercial.
 Fact Toothpaste – Alan Napier stars as the faithful Alfred Pennyworth as he explains how to get Batman and Robin posters through Fact toothpaste.

Public service announcements
The Batman character appeared in four public service announcements:
 U.S. Savings Bonds – in 1966, West, as Batman, encouraged schoolchildren to heed then-President Lyndon B. Johnson's call for them to buy U.S. savings stamps, a children's version of U.S. Savings bonds, to support the Vietnam War.
 British road safety – in 1967, a one-minute public information film (PIF) was created for the Central Office of Information in the United Kingdom. The PIF was filmed in Kennington, London and showed Batman, played by Adam West, taking a break from fighting crime to help children with their techniques of road safety.
 Safety caution – in 1966, due to multiple instances of UK children jumping from elevated locations attempting to emulate Batman, Adam West and Burt Ward recorded a short PIF to be shown prior to the airing of all episodes of Batman in the UK to explain to children that Batman could not fly. Ward exclaimed in one line, "Holy broken bones!" during this filming.
 U.S. Department of Labor – in a 1973 PSA for the U.S. Department of Labor Wage & Hour Division narrated by William Dozier, Batman and Robin were tied to a post amid the threat of a ticking time bomb, but Batgirl (Yvonne Craig) refused to release them because she was paid less than Robin (Burt Ward), in violation of the Federal Equal Pay Law. Dick Gautier played Batman this time, because West was, at the time, trying to distance himself from the role.

Batman Live!
During the summer/fall of 1966 Adam West and Frank Gorshin went on a tour as Batman and the Riddler to promote the new Batman movie and the series. They were usually accompanied by several bands before the featured event that saw Batman and the Riddler exchange corny jokes as well as a song performed by West. The tour most famously stopped at Shea Stadium in New York on June 25, 1966 and City Park in New Orleans on November 26, 1966.

Film appearances
 The 1960s TV series versions of Batman, Robin, Joker, Catwoman, and Penguin appear in Space Jam: A New Legacy. They are among the Warner Bros. Serververse inhabitants that watch the basketball game between the Tune Squad and the Goon Squad. The song's theme song can also be heard during runaway train scene in the first DC World sequence.

Music
 Batman: Exclusive Original Television Soundtrack Album is the official series soundtrack featuring the music of series composer Neal Hefti, the orchestra conducted by Nelson Riddle, in addition to the voices of Adam West, Burt Ward and several guest villains from the first season. It was released in 1966 through 20th Century Fox Records.
 Miranda, recorded by Adam West at the height of the series' popularity is an upbeat pop song about Batman falling in love but begging not to be asked to remove his mask. The B side featured West singing the non Batman related song You Only See Her. The album was released in 1966 through 20th Century Fox Records.
 The Capture and The Escape are a pair of jazzy singles recorded by Burgess Meredith. Both songs are essentially the telling of one story with side A explaining how Batman foiled the Penguin's latest plot and side B telling of the jailbreak. The songs were released in 1966 through ABC Records.
 The Riddler is a pop song written by Mel Torme and recorded by Frank Gorshin where Batman arch-villain The Riddler sings about himself while asking Riddles. The B side features the non-Batman related single by Gorshin, Never Let Her Go. The song was released in June 1966 through A&M Records.
 Boy Wonder I Love You is a pop song written by Frank Zappa and recorded by Burt Ward where Robin reads fan mail from his adoring fans. The B side features Ward singing Orange Colored Sky, which Batman co-star Adam West had previously performed on the variety television show, Hollywood Palace. Released in 1966 through MGM Records.
 Batman and Robin and The Story of Batman are a pair of talk-tunes recorded by Adam West to promote his 1976 appearances in the UK during the 10th anniversary of the TV series. Side A features Batman and Robin using pepper to defeat "The Tickler". Side B features Batman telling fans how the record can be converted into a disguise by looking through the center hole of the disc as if it was some kind of mask. In a Bit of Bat-Trivia, these recordings marked Adam West's return to the role of Batman (aside from public appearances) for the first time since the series ended. They were released through Target Records.

Pinball machine
The company Stern released the pinball machine Batman '66, based on the TV series, in December 2016. It is the first Stern game that features a full color LCD in the backbox instead of a Dot-matrix display. There are three different versions of the pinball machine: Super Limited Edition, Limited Edition and Premium.

Collectibles
Starting in 1966, an enormous amount of Batman merchandise was manufactured and marketed to cash-in on the TV show's vast popularity. This includes trading cards, bubblegum cards, scale model kits of the Batmobile and Batboat, coloring books, and board games. Items from this particular era have gained substantial collector appeal with their remarkable variety, scarcity, and style.

One of the most desired collectibles involves the episodes introducing Catwoman ("The Purr-fect Crime"/"Better Luck Next Time"), which were the subject of a View-Master reel & booklet set in 1966 (Sawyers Packet # B492). While the series was first-run on ABC, packet cover indicia reflected the "Bat Craze" cultural phenomenon by referring to the booklet as a Batbooklet, Dynamically Illustrated. By the time the television series was cancelled in 1968 and GAF had taken over the View-Master product, Batbooklet was removed in favor of then-standard View-Master packaging for all future releases in the decades to follow, right up to the period when the standard packet line was discontinued. The first season's superimposed fight onomatopoeias were not used for the View-Master's scenes of fights. Instead, black-lined "blast" balloons (transparent inside), and series-like onomatopoeias were illustrated and superimposed over fight images.

The popularity of the TV series has carried several decades after its debut; toy company Mattel has made the 1966 Batmobile in various scales for the Hot Wheels product line. The Batmobile with Batboat were also produced under the Matchbox and Corgi names in the UK, during this period.

Warner Bros. acquired merchandising rights to the series in 2012, and in 2013 Mattel released an action figure line based on the television series. To date only a single series of figures have been produced: Batman, the Joker, the Penguin, the Riddler, Catwoman and, exclusive to a boxset, Robin. Three Batman variants were also produced, a limited SDCC exclusive boxed figure, with an action feature that replicates the famous Batusi dance, a carded Surf's Up Batman figure complete with surfboard and trunks, and a boxed, unmasked Batman with Batcomputer and Bruce Wayne's study accessories. A carded Joker variant, with surfboard and trunks, and a boxed Batgirl figure followed. Each figure has the likeness of their respective actor (with Catwoman resembling Newmar and the Riddler resembling Gorshin) and came packaged with a display base and collector card. A Batmobile was also sold to retail making this the first time the classic model has been produced for action figures in the 6-inch scale.

In 2013, Hong Kong–based entertainment collectible manufacturer, Hot Toys, produced  scale versions of West's Batman and Ward's Robin. A large range of 8-inch action figures with the TV cast's likenesses have been released by Figures Toy Company (FTC) from 2013 to 2018 and, in 2017, a single wave of 3.75-inch figures (including King Tut, Bookworm and two Mr. Freezes) from Funko.

In 2016, to celebrate the 50th anniversary of the TV series, LEGO released set 76052 Classic TV series Batcave, featuring minifigure versions of Batman, Robin, Bruce Wayne, Dick Grayson, and the four main villains from the film (Catwoman, The Penguin, The Riddler, and Joker). In 2021, LEGO released a set based on the 1966 TV series Batmobile, featuring minifigure versions of Batman and Joker. This set was a newer version of a SDCC exclusive. Later that same year, LEGO released a build-able cowl based on the TV series.

Legacy
The series' stars, Adam West and Burt Ward, were typecast for decades afterwards, with West especially finding himself unable to escape the reputation of a hammy, camp actor. Years after the series' impact faded, an episode of Batman: The Animated Series paid tribute to West with an episode titled "Beware the Gray Ghost". In this episode, West himself provided the voice of an aging star of a superhero television series Bruce Wayne had watched as a child and from which he later found inspiration. This gave West new popularity with the next generation of fans. He also played Gotham City's Mayor Grange as a somewhat recurring role in The Batman. In addition, West played the voice of Thomas Wayne, Bruce Wayne's father in the episode "Chill of the Night" from the series Batman: The Brave and the Bold. West would eventually embrace his past with the series, and his recurring role as a fictionalized version of himself as Mayor West in the TV series Family Guy deliberately made no references to the series, at the behest of Family Guy creator Seth MacFarlane.

Burt Ward reprises his role as an old Dick Grayson in Crisis on Infinite Earths.

References in popular culture

In film

Batman
In the 1989 Batman movie, directed by Tim Burton, the Joker's real name is given as "Jack Napier", which is partly a homage to Alan Napier, who played butler Alfred Pennyworth throughout the series.

Batman Returns (1992)
Director Tim Burton confirmed the plot device of Penguin running for Mayor of Gotham City in Batman Returns was borrowed from the series episodes "Hizzoner The Penguin" and "Dizzoner The Penguin".

Additionally, Burgess Meredith, the actor who played the Penguin in the 1960s series, was originally asked to play the Penguin's father Tucker, but he declined due to his health problems which culminated with his death in 1997, and was replaced with Paul Reubens.

Batman Forever (1995)
A line spoken by Robin (Chris O'Donnell) in Batman Forever is an homage to the television Robin's catch-phrase exclamations that started "Holy" and sometimes ended "Batman!" – for instance "Holy bargain basements, Batman!" (from the television series' first season) and "Holy flypaper, Batman!" (from the television series' second season). During the film, Robin says "Holey rusted metal, Batman!" after the duo climbs onto twisted metal girders beside some water. This catchphrase also appeared for a time in Batman comic books.

The Dark Knight (2008)
The opening scene of The Dark Knight, the second installment of Christopher Nolan's Batman film series, The Dark Knight Trilogy, showcases a bank robbery by the Joker. Throughout the sequence, he wears a clown mask which is reminiscent of the one worn by Cesar Romero in "The Joker Is Wild!", his very first appearance as the Joker in the series.

The Dark Knight Rises (2012)
Although never confirmed as drawing inspiration and/or intentionally referencing the TV series, near the ending of The Dark Knight Rises Batman tries to toss a bomb into the ocean, just like he did in the 1966 movie based on the series itself.

The Lego Batman Movie (2017)
The animated spin-off of The Lego Movie starring Batman features a number of references to the television series. When Alfred addresses similar phases of Batman's life (in which he references all the years a Batman live-action film was released), he mentions "that weird one in 1966" in which the film briefly shows a clip of Adam West's Batman dancing in an episode. During the film's climax, Alfred dons an identical costume to Adam West's Batman out of nostalgia. When Batman and Robin take on a room of villains, they hit them so hard that onomatopoeia pops out of thin air while a remix of the 1960s theme song plays in the background.

Ready Player One (2018)
In the film, the Batmobile from the 1966 TV series appears along with other cars and vehicles from other films and TV series in a big race. In one scene in particular, the Batmobile's brakes squeal the notes to the TV series' theme song.

Joker (2019)
A young Bruce Wayne briefly appears in a sequence in the 2019 standalone Joker film, where he is seen sliding down a pole. Director Todd Phillips confirmed that was an Easter egg referencing the series.

In television

The Simpsons
The Simpsons has been a hotbed of Batman references throughout its run. Among the most enduring is Bart Simpson's alter-ego "Bartman" though the character only appeared on the series two times. The first was with Bart dressed as Bartman in "Three Men and a Comic Book" and the other in "Revenge Is a Dish Best Served Three Times" which tells of Bartman's origin which is eerily similar to that of Batman's.

The other major enduring reference is Radioactive Man. Though he appeared in comic book form during some season one episodes, his first major appearance is in the episode "Three Men and a Comic Book" which tells of his origin story. In the season 7 episode "Radioactive Man", Tim Burton, shown directing a Radioactive Man reboot, tells his staff that he doesn't want his film to be like "that campy 60s series", and he shows a clip parodying a Batman fight scene and Paul Lynde playing special guest villain The Scoutmaster.

Other Simpsons references to Batman include:
 The spinning scene transitions, a feature of the 1960s series, are parodied in several episodes.
 Adam West guest stars in "Mr. Plow" as he attends a new car show with the Simpsons and argues with Bart over the Tim Burton films starring Michael Keaton vs. the 1960s series. He also mentions the "real" Catwoman which was played by three different actresses in the 1966 movie and the series.
 In "The Joy of Sect", Homer sings the theme song but replaces "Batman" with fishing. Later, "Batman" is replaced with leader.
 "I Am Furious (Yellow)" guest stars Stan Lee who hangs around Comic Book Guy's store and wrecks a character's Batmobile by sticking an action figure of the Thing into the toy.
 In "Large Marge", Bart and Milhouse watch an episode of the 1960s TV series where Krusty the Clown is a guest villain called Clown Face. Adam West returned to reprise his role as Batman, and Burt Ward returned to reprise his role as Robin.
 In "Dark Knight Court", Mr. Burns becomes a character similar to Batman.

Other shows
 The SpongeBob SquarePants characters Mermaid Man and Barnacle Boy are obvious parodied of Batman and Robin from the 1966 TV series, as their TV show named "The Adventures of Mermaid Man and Barnacle Boy" parodies the series. In the season 7 episode "Back to the Past", it featured young versions of the superheroes in the past voiced by the respective actors of Batman and Robin, Adam West and Burt Ward.
 In The Fairly OddParents, Adam West occasionally voices a fictionalized, animated version of himself in the series, who plays the television superhero Catman in a tribute to the real West's role as Batman.
 In season 2, episode 11 of Kim Possible, Kim Possible's sidekick Ron Stoppable performs volunteer work at the home of recluse Timothy North (voiced by Adam West). He accidentally discovers a button concealed in a bust, leading to the Ferret Hole of (supposed) retired crime-fighter 'The Fearless Ferret'. Ron (voiced by Will Friedle), assumes North's mission 'to ferret out evil' until Ron and Kim discover that North is a gently delusional actor misremembering his time on a vintage TV show. Tributes include Batman and Batman Beyond (Friedle previously voiced Batman's successor in Batman Beyond), and gentle satire of West's challenges as a typecast actor and pop-culture icon.
 The animated television series Batman: The Brave and the Bold is influenced by the 1960s television series. The opening credits feature Batman rope-climbing up a building, something that Adam West and Burt Ward often did in the show. Several villains from the 1960s show including King Tut, Egghead, Mad Hatter, Archer, Bookworm, False Face, Black Widow, Siren, Marsha Queen of Diamonds, Louie the Lilac, Ma Parker, and Shame make cameo appearances as prisoners at Iron Heights prison in the episode "Day of the Dark Knight!" They are all captured by Batman and Green Arrow during a mass escape attempt. In Mayhem of the Music Meister!, the same villains have brief cameos. The episode "Game Over for Owlman!" shows a room in the Batcave containing "souvenirs" of deathtraps that the Joker employed in the 1960s series, with accompanying flashbacks: the giant key from the "Human Key Duplicator" from "The Impractical Joker", the slot machine-controlled electric chair from "The Joker Goes to School", and the giant clam from "The Joker's Hard Times". The episode "The Color of Revenge!" begins with a flashback to the time of the 1960s television series, using attributes such as the red Batphone, the Shakespeare bust, the sliding bookcase, the Batpoles, Robin in his old television-series costume, and the shot of Batman and Robin fastening their seat belts in the Batmobile. Additionally, the Adam West Batman briefly appears in "Night of the Batmen!" as part of an army of Batmen gathered across the Multiverse.
 The Young Justice episode "Schooled" briefly references the show, as well, by featuring a Shakespeare bust in Bruce's office at the Waynetech building in Metropolis. As a further homage to the series, Bruce is shown accessing an emergency Batsuit hidden in his desk by flipping a switch concealed within the bust.
 Adam West and Burt Ward lend their voices and likeness to the third DC Comics special on Robot Chicken. In the plot, when Batman brings over a Superman from another dimension to make him jealous, Superman retaliates by bringing the Adam West Batman, who trumps the Robot Chicken Batman by addressing the glucose issue of muffins and dancing. He is later seen battling the Arkham versions of Batman's villains and is killed by Penguin's anthrax gas. Burt Ward kidnaps him as well as the Robot Chicken Robin and takes them to the Lazarus Pit, where he resurrects West's Batman and makes himself younger to relive the glory days. He only kidnapped Robot Chicken Robin so he could have his outfit.
 Teen Titans Go! has made several references to various DC media, including some to the Batman 1966 TV series. In the episode "Mo' Money Mo' Problems" from Season 4, when the Titans come back to the Wayne Manor, the famous William Shakespeare bust from the series has a cameo as Robin referenced the TV series starring Adam West.
 The series Gotham includes various references to the 1960s television series. In the earlier seasons, the Shakespeare bust often makes cameo appearances at Wayne Manor. It can sometimes be seen on the fireplace shelf. In the episode "Red Hood", Bruce Wayne gives Alfred a bottle of vintage wine, year 1966. This was the year that the original TV series premiered. One of the main plots in the third season revolves around Penguin running for Mayor of Gotham City, which came from the 1960s episodes "Hizzoner the Penguin"/"Dizzoner the Penguin" and previously also inspired the film Batman Returns. In this 1960s two-parter, the Penguin used a death trap on the Dynamic Duo that involved ice blocks suspended over a giant heater; as the ice melted, Batman and Robin were slowly lowered into a vat of acid. In the Gotham episode "The Gentle Art of Making Enemies", Edward Nygma uses a more realistic version of the same death trap on Penguin. The ringtone of Edward Nygma's cell phone in "How the Riddler Got His Name" is an electronic version of the scene-to-scene transition sound effect from the 1960s television series that was always played before the opening theme sequence. In "The Primal Riddle", Ivy Pepper becomes Cobblepot's partner in crime and starts calling him "Pengy", which was a nickname often used for Penguin by his female accomplices in the original TV series. The iconic Batspray is also alluded to in "The Fear Reaper", in which Bruce uses a flammable aerosol can and a torch to fight a group of criminals. The 1960s Batman theme song is referenced in the episode "That's Entertainment". It is briefly played by Jerome Valeska and his gang after they take over a rock concert. In the fifth season, Penguin and the Riddler join forces to build a submarine in order to escape from Gotham City. This is an allusion to Penguin's submarine from the 1966 Batman film. In the series finale "The Beginning...", an adult Selina Kyle breaks into a diamond museum and proceeds to cut a hole into a glass case with her clawed gloves. The opening scene of the 1960s episode "The Purr-fect Crime" (which marked Catwoman's live-action debut), featured a very similar sequence, in which Catwoman's claws also cut a hole into a museum glass case.
 In the third episode of Birds of Prey, "Prey for the Hunter", the famous William Shakespeare bust from the series has a cameo. However, instead of bending the neck back to expose the button, it is simply turned to the left, giving it the same function—exposing a hidden passageway.
 In the "Heroes and Villains" episode of the British TV sitcom Only Fools and Horses, Del Boy (played by David Jason) and Rodney (played by Nicholas Lyndhurst) disguise themselves as Batman and Robin for a fancy-dress party. Along the way to the party, their appearance prevents an attempted mugging.
 In Arrow episode "Elseworlds", Kara finds a William Shakespeare bust in a box.
 In the Supergirl episode "Crisis on Infinite Earths", Burt Ward makes a cameo as an older Dick Grayson (as confirmed in the aftershow Crisis Aftermath) walking his dog on Earth-66 while wearing a shirt bearing his Robin colors. When the skies of his Earth turn red which signified its immediate destruction by the Anti-Monitor, Dick exclaims "Holy crimson skies of death!"
 In the Titans episode "Bruce Wayne", Bruce Wayne performs the "Batusi", a reference to the series.

In video games
 In Batman: Arkham City, there's a segment where the player must cross a part of the Iceberg Lounge where a vicious shark prowls. If Batman is killed by Tiny the shark, the game over screen may tell the player to "use the bat shark repellent", a reference to the 1966 movie.
 In the Batman: Arkham Origins video game, exclusive DLC for the PlayStation 3 includes a Batman skin based on the Batman TV series. The game also includes an Easter egg referencing Burgess Meredith's Penguin in the form of a stranded ship named the Olivia B. Meredith.
 In Batman: Arkham Knight, the Shakespeare bust containing a hidden button used in the TV series as the secret entrance lever to the Batcave appears as one of the game's Easter eggs. Shakespeare busts concealing buttons can be seen and interacted with in the Clock Tower and Wayne Office areas of the game. The Batman skin is also featured as DLC in with the 1960s series Robin and Catwoman skins, as well as the Batmobile.
 Rather than sporting organically red lips, the Joker in the Arkham franchise uses lipstick to make his unnaturally large smile even larger. The use of lipstick is reminiscent of Cesar Romero's Joker, who used facepaint to create his clownish visage.

Lego Batman 3: Beyond Gotham
In Lego Batman 3: Beyond Gotham, an extra level based on the series is included, titled "Same Bat-time, Same Bat-channel", along with characters including Batman, Robin, Batgirl, Joker, Catwoman, Riddler, Penguin and Alfred. Adam West serves as a playable character. The Batmobile from the show is also included as a drivable vehicle. The end credits sequence remakes the Batclimb window cameos.

See also

 1960s in television
 Television in the United States

Notes

References

External links

 
 "Batman" at the Museum of Broadcast Communications
 
 "Jean Boone – Interview with Cast of Batman, The Movie (1966)" from the Texas Archive of the Moving Image
 Batman Sells US Savings Bonds (1966)

 
1966 American television series debuts
1968 American television series endings
1960s American comic science fiction television series
1960s American crime television series
1960s American satirical television series
American action adventure television series
American crime comedy television series
American superhero comedy television series
American Broadcasting Company original programming
English-language television shows
Television series by 20th Century Fox Television
Television shows set in the United States
Television shows adapted into comics
Television shows adapted into films
Television shows based on DC Comics